is a Japanese politician and member of the House of Councillors in the Diet (national legislature). A native of Akita, Akita and graduate of Chuo University, he was elected to the House of Councillors since 2004 after working at Akita Television.

References

External links 
 Official website in Japanese.

Members of the House of Councillors (Japan)
Chuo University alumni
Living people
1949 births